Line 15 of CRT is a rapid transit express line in Chongqing, China. It will run in an east–west direction in the north of Chongqing metropolitan area, via the airport. The construction started in 2021.

Stations (west to east)

Phases 1 and 2

References 

Transport infrastructure under construction in China